SPNRC High School (Sri Posani Narasimha Rao Choudari High School, Telugu:శ్రీ పోసాని నరసింహారావు చౌదరి ఉన్నత పాఠశాల) is a co-educational aided secondary school. It was established on 12 August 1964 in Gollapudi beside the National Highway 9, India. It is one of the oldest schools in Vijayawada. The school was established on 12 August 1964 for VI and VII classes with 140 pupils and 3 teachers. In 1965-66 the school was upgraded to VIII class.  In 1966-67 the school was further upgraded to open IV form.  In 1967-68, permission was granted to open old V form and new IX class.  In 1968-69, permission was accorded for opening of New X class and old SSLC.

The school building was opened in 1968 by the then Chief Minister of Andhra Pradesh Sri Kasu Brahmananda Reddi, which was built at a cost of Rs.2,25,000/- on 2.8 acres of land.

The donor and founder of the school Smt. Posani Naga Bhushanamma died in 1978.

Details
The school is under the Sri Posani Narasimha Rao Chowdari High School Education Society, society No.32 of 1967 under the Societies Registration Act XXI of 1860, according to 
Rc. No.599/B1/2010 dated 15-02-2010 of the Regional Director of School Education, Kakinada. Permission was accorded for VI to X classes.

The medium of instruction is Telugu.

It has twelve 24 feet by 22 feet rooms, twelve 12 feet by 12 feet rooms, and 6 16 feet X 22 feet rooms.

HeadmMasters

Summary

Extra-curricular activities
Students have become National players and State players in Kho-Kho game.  Popular games in school are Kho kho, Kabaddi, volleyball, throw ball, tennikoit, ball badminton and athletics. School games are conducted every year on the occasion of Republic Day (India).

The co-curricular activities include essay writing, elocution, debate, drawing, and singing. The winners are awarded with prizes on Republic Day (India).

1964 establishments in Andhra Pradesh
Education in Vijayawada
Educational institutions established in 1964
High schools and secondary schools in Andhra Pradesh
Schools in Krishna district